Zuzana Brzobohatá (born 11 July 1962) is a Czech Social Democratic Party politician. She sat as a Member of the European Parliament for the Czech Republic from 2009 to 2014.

After graduating from the Brno University of Technology, Brzobohatá worked as an IT specialist and a teacher. Having been active in local and regional politics from 1998, she sat in the Chamber of Deputies of the Parliament of the Czech Republic from November 2008 until July 2009, when she took up her seat in the European Parliament.

Footnotes

1962 births
Living people
Politicians from Brno
Members of the Chamber of Deputies of the Czech Republic (2006–2010)
Women MEPs for the Czech Republic
Czech Social Democratic Party MEPs
MEPs for the Czech Republic 2009–2014
20th-century Czech women politicians
Czech schoolteachers
21st-century Czech women politicians
Brno University of Technology alumni